Mount Huaguo or Flowers and Fruit Mountain, is a major area featured in the novel Journey to the West. A number of real-world locations have been connected with the Mount Huaguo, although the synonymous mountain in Lianyungang, Jiangsu is most commonly identified as its source of inspiration.

Description

In the novel, this mountain is located in the country of Aolai (傲來) in the Eastern Continent of Superior Deity, also known in Anthony C. Yu's translation as  the "Pūrvavideha Continent". It is known as the birthplace of Sun Wukong (the Monkey King), a protagonist of the novel. The large mountain has many demons and monkeys in its population and contains many hidden areas, such as the Shuilian Cave. After Sun Wukong bravely rushes through a large waterfall and into this cave, every individual in the mountain acknowledges him as their king.

After Sun Wukong becomes king, this mountain becomes exceedingly civilized and well-trained for various future conflicts, such as war. This can be seen in the fact that Sun Wukong often left this mountain for various reasons, including his eventual task of protecting the Tang monk Tang Sanzang on his journey to India. Due to the natural and civilized ways of this mountain set by Sun Wukong, this mountain continues to thrive even after 500 years of conflict.

A "Water Curtain Cave" or "Shuilian Cave" is featured within the novel Journey to the West, written in the Ming Dynasty. Very early on, Sun Wukong becomes the king of this cave, and it is generally used for all the monkeys to train within and generally rest. Before such an event, Wukong, with his bravery, nominated himself to be the monkey that would rush through the Mount Huaguo's great waterfall in order to see what was behind it. He discovered

Emerald moss piled up in heaps of blue,
White clouds like drifting jade,
While the light flickered among wisps of coloured mist.
A quiet house with peaceful windows,
Flowers growing on the smooth bench;
Dragon pearls hanging in niches,
Exotic blooms all around.
Traces of fire beside the stove,
Scraps of food in the vessels by the table.
Adorable stone chairs and beds,
Even better stone plates and bowls.
One or two tall bamboos,
Three or four sprigs of plum blossom,
A few pines that always attract rain,
All just like a real home.

Following this, Wukong

took a good, long look and then scampered to the middle of the bridge, from where he noticed a stone tablet. On the tablet had been carved in big square letters: HAPPY LAND OF THE MOUNTAIN OF FLOWERS AND FRUIT, CAVE HEAVEN OF THE WATER CURTAIN (Chinese: 花果山福地、水帘洞洞天). The stone monkey was beside himself with glee. He rushed away, shut his eyes, crouched, and leapt back through the waterfall.''

After many points following this, Sun Wukong returned to the Water Curtain Cave for miscellaneous reasons, either while returning from his celestial master, or because of an issue with his enlightened master, Sanzang.

References

Huaguo, Mount
Journey to the West
Fictional locations in China